Godon may refer to:

Alain Godon (b. 1964), French painter and sculptor 
Ingrid Godon (b. 1958), Flemish illustrator
Kervin Godon (b. 1982), Mauritian footballer (soccer player)
Sylvanus William Godon (1809–1879), American admiral

See also
Gordon (disambiguation)